The Ilyushin Il-103 is a single-engine, low-wing training aircraft developed by the Ilyushin Design Bureau that started in 1990 in the Soviet Union. The aircraft is now produced in Russia. It was the first Russian aircraft to achieve Federal Aviation Administration certification, in 1998, for sales in the United States.

Operational history
Reviewers Dave Unwin and Marino Boric described the design in a 2015 review as "very robust, safe and comfortable. It was designed for everyday operation on poor runways and with the ability to cope with every variation of the harsh Russian climate."

Russia’s United Aircraft Corporation reached an agreement with  Aviation Engineering Zrt of Pécs, Hungary, to develop and licence produce a modernised version of the Ilyushin Il-103 in Hungary in March 2021.

Operators

Current 

 Lao People's Liberation Army Air Force: three delivered with 21 ordered

Peruvian Army: Five operated out six delivered.

Former 

Republic of Korea Air Force: 23 in service as of June 2011.

Specifications (Il-103)

See also

References

Further reading

External links

 Base Aérea Lima-Callao: Aviación del Ejército del Peru. (in English)

Il-103
1990s Soviet and Russian civil utility aircraft
Single-engined tractor aircraft
Low-wing aircraft
Aircraft first flown in 1994